Megala is a 2007-2010 Indian Tamil-language soap opera that aired on Sun TV from 4 June 2007 to 25 April 2008 on Monday through Friday at 19:30 (IST) and from 28 April 2008 to 23 April 2010 at 18:00 (IST). It ran for 729 episodes. It had been receiving the highest ratings of Tamil serials and received high praising from viewers. The show starring by Gayathiri, Deepan Chakravarthy Yugendran, Vadivukkarasi, Kuyili, Shreekumar, Rajkanth and Bhavana. The show producer by Metti Oli serial fame Cine Times Entertainment Siddhiq and directed by Vikramathithan. It replaced Anjali.  It was also aired in Sri Lanka Tamil Channel on Shakthi TV.

Plot
The story of a couple, Kalai and Thilaga, who have five children. Kalai's sister Vadivu lives with him and Kalai is totally devoted to Vadivu and does all that she says. Vadivu (Vadivukkarasi) tries to separate the couple as she does not like Thilaga. Mehala born to this couple and Vadivu hates that, convincing Kalai to disown her from the family. Hence Mehala (Gayathiri) is brought up in her grandparents home and Thilaga often visits to the home with her other kids. Mehala is very fond of her other siblings.

One day, due to a quarrel between Thilaga and Vadivu, Mehala hits vadivu and she got fainted. By seeing this, Mehala thought she died and ran away from home. She runs to various places and continue with her studies with the help of her friends. When Mehala was on the run, she saw an old man trying to commit suicide and she saves him from committing that. Mehala works as an assistant to a lawyer upon completing her education. Meanwhile, she tries to search for her family back.

Cast

Main cast

 Gayathiri Shastry as Megala
Rajyalakshmi as Thilaga
 Deepan Chakravarthy as Kalaiyarasan
 Sakthi Saravanan as Sheziyan
 Srividya Mohan as Kanmani
 Revathi Priya as Keerthana
 Vadivukkarasi as Shanmuga vadivu
Aneesh Ravi as Anbu
 Vijaya Sharathy as Vishwa 
 Shreekumar as Diwakaran "Diwa"
 Bharathy as Diwakaran's mother
Kuyili as Vishwa's mother
 Rajkanth as Bhoopathy
 Bhavana as Sakthi
 Sanjeev as Prathap\kannan

Recurring cast

 Samukasundharam as Kalai
 Panumathy
 Sri Lekha
 Pandu
 Sumathy Sri
 Revathy Priya as kirthana
 Sangeetha as Anitha
 Rangathurai
 Giri
 Joker Thulasi as Constable Gopal
 Kavitha Solairaja as Subha
 Hema
 Sumangali
 Director Sadhasivam
 Jothy
 Senthil
 Rajmathan
 Priyanka as Viji
 Sobhana
 Vincent Roy
 Ravi Raj
 Nithya Ravindran
 kirthiga
 Kovai Papu
 Gowthami Vembunathan

Original soundtrack

Title song
The title track was composed by Vijay Antony and was sung by  popular playback singer Shreya Ghoshal. The lyrics for the title track were written by Yugabharathi. The title song is a super hit among television viewers.Re recording was done by Sanjeev Rathan

Soundtrack

Production
The series was directed by Vikramathithan. It was produced by Cine Times Entertainment Siddhiq, along with the production crew of 2002-2016 Sun TV Serials Metti Oli, Malargal and Muhurtam.

Awards and nominations

International broadcast
The Series was released on 4 June 2007 on Sun TV. The Show was also broadcast internationally on Channel's international distribution. It airs in Sri Lanka, South East Asia, Middle East, United States, Canada, Europe, Oceania, South Africa and Sub Saharan Africa on Sun TV. 
 The series aired in Sri Lanka on the Tamil channel Shakthi TV.
 It was also dubbed in Telugu as Mayuri and aired in then Indian state of Andhra Pradesh on Gemini TV.

See also
 List of programs broadcast by Sun TV
 List of TV shows aired on Sun TV (India)

References

External links
 Official Website 
 Sun TV on YouTube
 Sun TV Network 
 Sun Group 

Sun TV original programming
2000s Tamil-language television series
2007 Tamil-language television series debuts
Tamil-language television shows
2010 Tamil-language television series endings